Robin of Sherwood is a British television series, based on the legend of Robin Hood. Created by Richard Carpenter, it was produced by HTV in association with Goldcrest, and ran from 28 April 1984 to 28 June 1986 on the ITV network. In the United States it was shown on the premium cable TV channel Showtime and, later, on PBS. The show starred Michael Praed and Jason Connery as two different incarnations of the title character. Unlike previous adaptations of the Robin Hood legend, Robin of Sherwood combined a gritty, authentic production design with elements of real-life history, 20th-century fiction, and pagan myth. Robin of Sherwood has been described by historian Stephen Knight as "the most innovative and influential version of the myth in recent times". The series is also notable for its musical score by Clannad, which won a BAFTA award.

Overview
Richard Carpenter had previously worked with producer Paul Knight on two other dramas involving historical adventure, Dick Turpin (1979–1982) and Smuggler (1981).  For their next project, Carpenter and Knight decided to have their production company Gatetarn do an adaptation of the Robin Hood legend. With the aid of television producer Sidney Cole, Carpenter and Knight were able to create a production deal for the show. Goldcrest Films, the US network Showtime, HTV and Gatetarn agreed to fund the series. Robin of Sherwood was more expensive than Carpenter and Knight's previous series; each episode of Robin of Sherwood cost around £500,000 to film. Filming on Robin of Sherwood began in 1983. The show premiered in 1984, on ITV in the UK and on Showtime in the United States. There were three series, composed of a two-hour opening episode and 24 one-hour long episodes, although the pilot is sometimes screened as two one-hour episodes. The episodes comprising "The Swords of Wayland" were transmitted as one episode in the UK on their original screening, on a bank holiday weekend in 1985. The show was shot on film and almost entirely on location, mostly in the northeast and southwest of England; HTV West in Bristol was the base of operations, and most of the filming was done in and around Bristol and its surrounding counties. Primary locations were the Blaise Castle Estate in North Bristol and Vassals Park to the south. Some of the forest scenes were shot near Bradford-on-Avon.

Robin of Sherwood is one of the most influential treatments of the core Robin Hood legend since The Adventures of Robin Hood, featuring a realistic period setting and introducing the character of a Saracen outlaw. Carpenter also added fantasy elements to the story (which had not appeared in previous TV versions of the legend). These included Robin's supernatural mentor Herne the Hunter, Robin gaining a magic sword called Albion, and the outlaws battling against black magicians and demons as well as the Sheriff and his henchmen.

Michael Praed played Robin of Loxley in the first two series. His 'Merry Men' consisted of Will Scarlet (Ray Winstone), Little John (Clive Mantle), Friar Tuck (Phil Rose), Much (Peter Llewellyn Williams), the Saracen Nasir (Mark Ryan) and Lady Marian (Judi Trott). He is also assisted by Herne the Hunter (John Abineri). As in the legend, Robin is opposed by the Sheriff of Nottingham (Nickolas Grace) and Guy of Gisburne (Robert Addie), as well as the Sheriff's brother Abbot Hugo (Philip Jackson) (representing all the greedy abbots in the legends).

In the opening story, Robin Hood and the Sorcerer, Robin and his half-brother Much fall foul of the Sheriff's henchman, Sir Guy of Gisburne and are imprisoned in Nottingham Castle. They manage to escape, and gather a team of fellow rebels to fight back against the Sheriff's authority.

At the end of the second series, Robin of Loxley is killed, and Robert of Huntingdon (played by Jason Connery) replaces him as Robin Hood. The third series had the same episode count as the first two combined, so each incarnation of Robin featured in the same number of episodes.

At the conclusion of Series Three, Goldcrest was forced to pull out of the venture, due to a downturn in the fortunes of their film arm. Goldcrest had been responsible for critical and commercial hits such as Chariots of Fire (1981) and Gandhi (1982) earlier in the 1980s, but had hit a lean period with such films as Revolution (1985) and Absolute Beginners (1986).  The series was expensive to produce; HTV could not afford to finance it alone, and so Robin of Sherwood came to an unexpected end. Goldcrest invested £1,289,000 in the first six episodes, £1,944,000 in the next seven and £4,035,000 in the next twelve. Despite the huge popularity of the series, Goldcrest's financial difficulties due to its cinematic investments, prevented further production.

During the course of the third series, the new Robin discovers that he is the half-brother of his nemesis Guy of Gisburne (an idea suggested to Carpenter by the fact that both actors had blond hair). Carpenter planned to have Guy eventually discover that his greatest enemy was also his half-brother. This particular story arc was never resolved, as the show's intended fourth (and final) series was never made. The fourth season would have also featured the return of Baron de Belleme. The sudden cancellation also broke off Robin and Marion's intended marriage and left Marion at Halstead Abbey as a novice. Carpenter later said that, if he had known the third season would be last, he would have married Robin and Marion.

After the series ended, Carpenter and Knight tried several times to revive the show. First, Knight tried to gain funding from US producers for a fourth season, but was unsuccessful. Carpenter then wrote a script for a feature film adaptation of the series, and tried to get funding for it. Carpenter said in a 1990 interview that the film was intended to star the TV series' regular cast (with a new actor playing Robin if Connery was unavailable). Carpenter also said that the film would not be an adaptation of the unmade fourth season, but "a story on its own". The appearance of two Robin Hood films in 1991 (Robin Hood and Robin Hood: Prince of Thieves) meant that Carpenter and Knight could not interest potential producers in a third Robin Hood film.

Temporal setting
Robin of Sherwood is set in the usual period for Robin Hood stories – England in the late 12th and early 13th centuries, during the reigns of the Angevin kings Richard I and John.

Robin Hood and the Sorcerer opens in the year 1180 AD, before flashing forward fifteen years ahead. In the final episode of Series One, however, King Richard's return to England following his capture and ransom is depicted, which occurred in 1194. The Series Two episode "The Prophecy" is set in the year 1199 AD, when Prince John becomes King of England. In the Series Three episode "The Time of the Wolf (Part One)", the Sheriff dictates a legal document dated for the year 1211 AD, and the plot of the episode involves King John raising an army to fight Llywelyn of Wales (a historical event which took place in that same year).

Cast and characters

The Merry Men
 Robin of Loxley (Michael Praed)Born the son of Anglo-Saxon nobleman Ailric of Loxley, Robin was raised by his uncle, the local miller, after Ailric was murdered. As an adult, Robin accepts the charge of Herne the Hunter and becomes the prophesied "Hooded Man," champion of the oppressed. Hiding in Sherwood Forest, he assembles a number of friends and fights for freedom and justice.  He is killed at the end of Series Two by Norman crossbowmen, on the orders of the Sheriff of Nottingham – the same manner in which his father died.
 Much (Peter Llewellyn Williams)Son of the miller who raised Robin, he admires Robin as his big brother. He is dubbed "the half-wit" by Guy of Gisburne, but he is more uneducated and naive than intellectually impaired. He matures more after the first Robin's death.
 Will Scarlet (Ray Winstone)Originally called Will Scathlock. When his wife, Elena, is raped, beaten and trampled to death with horses by mercenaries, he changes his name after slaying several of her killers. Hot-headed and filled with hatred of all things Norman, he is contrasted with the more collected Robin, which frequently leads to conflicts. He has a brother who owns an inn in Lichfield.
 Little John (Clive Mantle)Originally John Little from Hathersage, this giant of a man is placed under a spell by the Baron de Belleme. When Robin defeats the Baron and frees John from the spell, John becomes a loyal friend to Robin (and later, to Robert of Huntington). His hulking figure and immense strength is contrasted by his soft heart.
 Lady Marion of Leaford (Judi Trott)Daughter of a Saxon nobleman believed to be killed in battle, Marion lives as a ward of Abbot Hugo, who is keen on gaining her inheritance. She first enters a nunnery, but when Simon de Belleme desires her as his bride (actually intending to sacrifice her), she escapes into Sherwood Forest, where she falls in love with and marries Robin Hood. She is later rescued from another unwanted marriage, by Robert of Huntingdon.
 Friar Tuck (Phil Rose)Chaplain to the Sheriff of Nottingham, he helps Lady Marion escape into Sherwood and joins the Merry Men, forming a fast friendship with Little John. Carpenter said that Tuck "represents the better side of Christianity."
 Nasir (Mark Ryan)A Saracen assassin, he was captured in Palestine by the Baron de Belleme and brought back to England to work as his henchman. After the Baron is killed by Robin, Nasir – having found respect for Robin during a crucial sword fight – decides to join the Merry Men. Throughout the series, he speaks very little. Initially, Ryan's character was intended to be killed in Robin Hood and the Sorcerer. However, Ryan proved so popular with the show's cast and crew, that Carpenter decided to make him a regular instead.
 Robert of Huntingdon (Jason Connery)Chosen as Robin's successor by Herne, Robert frees the Merry Men, but thinks himself inadequate to take up the mantle of the Hooded Man, despite his sympathies towards the downtrodden. He changes his mind after Lady Marion is taken by Lord Owen of Clun, and sets out to rescue her, reassembling the scattered Merry Men in the process. Though slightly insecure about taking over, in light of his predecessor, Robert proves to be an excellent leader. He later discovers that he is the half-brother of Guy of Gisburne.
 Herne the Hunter (John Abineri)A shamanic figure who often incarnates a forest spirit representing the powers of light and goodness, inspiring and protecting the Hooded Man. Carpenter stated that Herne was based on the Pagan idea of the Horned God.

Main antagonists
 Robert de Rainault, Sheriff of Nottingham (Nickolas Grace)The king's chief representative in Nottingham and Sherwood, he is mainly interested in increasing his own power and wealth, competing with his younger brother, the Abbot. He considers his serfs mere chattels and hates women. He frequently relies on the brawn of Guy of Gisburne, whom he nonetheless disrespects and ridicules for his failures. His ambition results in strained relations with fellow noblemen (who consider him a "dreadful little man"), and with a succession of kings.
 Hugo de Rainault, Abbot of St. Mary's (Philip Jackson)The sheriff's younger brother and highest-ranking church man in Nottingham, his main interest lies in acquiring land, especially that of his temporary ward, Lady Marion, and her father.
 Sir Guy of Gisburne (Robert Addie)Steward over the abbot's lands and gamekeeper of Sherwood, he is the chief military commander in the area. Self-identifying "a warrior and not a courtier", he is prone to disregard diplomacy and tact in favour of brute force but he is sometimes also able to use cunning. He resents the Sheriff for frequently taunting him and Robin for being the cause of these taunts. After a rocky start he gained the (limited) respect of Prince John. Later, it is revealed that he is the Earl of Huntingdon's illegitimate son and thus the second Robin's half-brother.
 Baron Simon de Belleme (Anthony Valentine)A nobleman and also a devil worshipper. As master of the black arts, he controlled both Little John and Nasir, having captured the latter during the Crusades. He desires Lady Marion to sacrifice her to his demons. He is killed by Robin in Series One but his remaining disciples still work towards and actually succeed in his resurrection in Series Two. However he is not heard of or seen in Series Three.
 Prince John, later King of England (Phil Davis) John is first mentioned in The King's Fool, where it is stated that the Sheriff and Abbot Hugo supported him against King Richard. King John appears in the episode The Prophecy, where he is depicted as manipulative, bullying and lecherous. John becomes King in The Prophecy after Richard's death. 
 Gulnar (Richard O'Brien)A pagan sorcerer in the entourage of Lord Owen of Clun, he bewitches Lady Marion. After Owen is killed, he sets out to avenge Owen's death – and his own disgrace – on Robin and the Merry Men.

Other notable characters
 Richard the Lionheart, King of England (John Rhys-Davies)First encountered by Robin's band in Sherwood while returning to Nottingham from the Crusades in disguise. He initially appears to be an ally, removing de Rainault from the Sheriff's office and pardoning the outlaws. A warrior by nature and not inclined to remain in and properly govern England, Richard tries to get Robin to join his army, but when Robin, realising what sort of man Richard really is, publicly refuses, he orders Robin killed (unsuccessfully). He subsequently returns to Normandy and is killed by an enemy arrow; the news of his death reaches Nottingham while Prince John is visiting, and Gisburne is the first to declare John the new king. Unlike traditional Robin Hood stories, Robin of Sherwood depicts Richard as being villainous and being as bad as his brother, Prince John. Herne the Hunter refers to King Richard as "the Lion spawned of the Devil's Brood" in The King's Fool, a reference to the medieval legend of the Plantagenet family being descended from the spirit Melusine.
 The Old Prisoner (Stuart Linden)The mainstay of the Nottingham dungeon, he repeatedly refuses to flee, as he will not part with his pet rat Arthur, and advises all prisoners that the only way out is "feet first".
 Edward of Wickham (Jeremy Bulloch)The headman of the village of Wickham, he and all of the villagers are sympathetic to Robin Hood's band and assist them occasionally.
 Richard of Leaford (George Baker)The father of Lady Marion, important Anglo-Saxon landowner and loyal follower of King Richard, he was captured during the Crusades and presumed dead. Later released by Saladin, he is captured and secretly brought to Nottingham by Prince John, but freed by Robin. Later, he is reconciled to King John (by paying a large sum of money, which also bought a pardon for Marion) and returns to his estates, which are still coveted by the de Rainault brothers.
 Earl of Huntingdon (Michael Craig)An important nobleman and a careful politician, he is father to the second Robin Hood and (unknown to him) also to Guy of Gisburne. When Robert becomes the new Robin Hood, the Earl disinherits him; the two later reconcile emotionally.
 Lord Owen of Clun (Oliver Cotton)A half-Welsh nobleman holding strategically important lands on the Welsh border, he is courted by the Earl of Huntingdon on behalf of King John. Desiring Lady Marion as his wife, he has her kidnapped and bewitched, but he is outsmarted by the Merry Men and killed during their escape.
 Meg of Wickham (Claire Toeman)Little John's girlfriend who lives in the outlaw-friendly village of Wickham.
 Alan-a-Dale (Peter Hutchinson)The former minstrel (and not a very good one!) to the Baron de Bracy, he is in love with the Baron's daughter Mildred.
 Mildred de Bracy (Stephanie Tague)The object of an arranged marriage to the Sheriff of Nottingham (who is after her dowry money), but in love with Alan-a-Dale.
 Morgwyn of Ravenscar (Rula Lenska)Outwardly the Abbess in charge of Ravenscar Abbey near the village of Uffcombe-on-the-Rock, she is secretly an evil witch and the leader of the Cauldron of Lucifer, a powerful coven dedicated to the raising of Lucifer. She seeks the Seven Swords of Wayland to use their power, but one of them (Albion) is in Robin Hood's possession. She succeeds in bewitching the Merry Men and turning them against Robin and Marion for a time, but Robin foils her plans, and she is ultimately destroyed by her own demon riders.
 Bertrand de Nivelles (Oliver Tobias)The leader of a band of mercenaries called in by Guy of Gisburne to destroy Robin Hood and his men.
 Ralph of Huntingdon (Trevor Clarke)A young captain who briefly becomes the Sheriff's new favourite.  He is killed by Guy of Gisburne at Castle Belleme.
 Isadora (Cathryn Harrison)The daughter of Lord Agravaine and privy to the secret of Caerleon.
 Lord Agravaine (Cyril Cusack)Robert of Huntington's godfather and guardian of a secret treasure in the castle of Caerleon.
 Philip Mark (Lewis Collins)The brutal former Head Forester of Lincolnshire who is appointed by King John to take Robert de Rainault's place as Sheriff of Nottingham; his tenure as Sheriff is extremely brief.
 Sarak (Valentine Pelka)A Saracen with a scarred face hidden by a mask, he is the right-hand man of Philip Mark and a former hashashin who betrayed the brotherhood's secrets for money. He bears a grudge against Nasir, who was sent after him to kill him, but only scarred him.
 Roger de Carnac (Matt Frewer)On King John's orders, he and his men impersonate the second Robin and the Merry Men in a plan to discredit them with the people.
 Queen Hadwisa (Patricia Hodge)King John's first wife who is unceremoniously cast aside when King John chooses the 11-year-old Isabella as his new wife and who hatches a complex plot to depose John.
 Adam Bell (Bryan Marshall)A famous outlaw who returns to Nottingham from the North after many years.
 Edgar of Huntingdon (Ian Ogilvy)The second Robin's uncle, who has a hidden agenda against his brother, the Earl.
 Mad Mab (Annabelle Lee)A madwoman accused of witchcraft, and defended by the Merry Men.  Ultimately it is revealed that she is indeed a witch.
 Grendel (James Coombes)Gulnar's right-hand man under Owen of Clun, he later becomes the fanatical leader of the Sons of Fenris.

Episodes

In repeats, episodes have frequently been broadcast out of order, and alternative orders have been suggested. The original running order creates a number of continuity errors, the most notable being Marian's father being referred to as being dead in "The Swords of Wayland" even though he was discovered to be alive in "The Prophecy" and appears in later episodes.

Places of action

Villages
 Loxley, burned childhood village of the first Robin – filmed at Mells Park
 Wickham, an important village in the series where the lover (Meg) of Little John lived 
 Cromm Cruac, phantom village created by Gulnar (named after the Irish deity Cromm Cruac and seen only in the episode of the same name)
 Elsdon, mentioned in the episode The Witch of Elsdon
 Uffcombe, village attacked by Hounds of Lucifer

Castles and cities
 Nottingham Castle – filmed at several other locations
 Castle of Belleme
 Castle of Lord Owen (Clun Castle) – filmed at Kidwelly Castle (outside)
 Castle of Gwydion – filmed at several other locations
 Castle of Huntingdon, childhood home of the second Robin – filmed at several other locations
 Leaford
 Caerleon – filmed at several other locations

Abbeys
 Warren – filmed at several other locations
 Thornton – filmed at several other locations
 Ravenscar – filmed at several other locations
 Croxden – filmed at several other locations
 Kirklees – filmed at several other locations
 Grimstone – filmed at several other locations
 Halstead – filmed elsewhere

Landscape
 Sherwood Forest – filmed at several other locations, Greyfield Woods were used for scenes by the famous waterfall with lots of dry ice
 Tor of last stand of first Robin – filmed near Burrington Camp

Music

The music for Robin of Sherwood was composed and performed by Irish folk group Clannad. The show's original soundtrack, Legend, was released in 1984 and won the BAFTA award for Best Original Television Music.

Three singles were released from the album: the theme-tune "Robin (The Hooded Man)", "Now is Here" and "Scarlet Inside". An EP contained a remix of "Robin (The Hooded Man)" from the third series.

While not all of the show's music is found on the Legend album, some additional pieces can be found on Clannad's albums Macalla (released 1986) and Clannad: Live in Concert, 1996 (released 2005). In November 2003, Clannad revealed on their official web site that "there were several other pieces of music recorded for the third series of Robin of Sherwood that were not included on the Legend album. Unfortunately no-one has been able to locate the master tapes of this music. The search is continuing and hopefully one day these recordings will be able to be released."

Crew
 Directed by: Ian Sharp and others (see Episode guide).
 Written by: Richard Carpenter and others (see Episode guide).
 Cinematography: Roger Pearce, Howard Rockliffe, Gary Breckon and Bob Edwards
 Music: Clannad
 Production design: John Biggs and Ken Sharp
 Costume design: Lynette Cummin
 Scenic artist: Peter Gray
 Editing: David McCormick, Andy Findlay, Robin Inger, and others.
 Casting: Esta Charkham and Beth Charkham
 Special effects: Ken Lailey
 Stunt co-ordination: Terry Walsh
 Horse Master: Steve Dent

Reception

A review at rpg.net, written in 2003, opines:

Reviewing Robin of Sherwood for SFX magazine, Jayne Nelson stated that "this incarnation of England's most famous outlaw will probably never be bettered". Nelson praised the show's "excellent writing, moody cinematography and haunting score." Nelson also said that "The Greatest Enemy" was the best episode of the show, followed by "The Swords of Wayland" and "The Sheriff of Nottingham".

Richard Marcus, writing on blogcritics.org, writes in 2008:

Controversy
ITV aired Robin of Sherwood during an early-evening television slot, and promoted the programme as being for a family audience. Mary Whitehouse and the National Viewers and Listeners' Association criticised Robin of Sherwood as being unsuitable for children (as the organisation previously did with Doctor Who).  Whitehouse claimed that the show depicted "extensive violence", objected to the depiction of Satanic villains in "The Swords of Wayland", and also criticised the apparent "resurrection" of Robin in "The Greatest Enemy" as being disrespectful to Christianity. Carpenter later met Whitehouse for a public debate, and introduced himself to her and the audience by saying "I'm Richard Carpenter, and I'm a professional writer. And you're a professional... what?"  The Guinness Book of Classic British TV defended Robin of Sherwood, stating that the show's "swordplay was strictly zero blood" and that the supernatural elements were the result of Carpenter's "love for the subject matter".

Comic strip
A comic strip based on Robin of Sherwood ran in Look-in magazine from April 1984 to September 1986.

DVD and Blu-ray releases
 "Series 1 – Part 1 – Episodes 1 To 3 DVD."
 "Series 1 – Part 2 – Episodes 4 To 6 DVD."
 "Series 2 – Part 1 – Episodes 1 To 4 DVD."
 "Series 2 – Part 2 – Episodes 5 To 7 DVD."
 "Series 3 – Part 1 – Episodes 1 To 6 DVD." 
 "Series 3 – Part 2 – Episodes 7 To 13 DVD." 
 "The Complete Series 1 DVD" , 
 "The Complete Series 2 DVD" 
 "Complete DVD"
 "The Complete Series (NTSC)"

In the US and Canada, the first and second series have been released by Acorn Media in a five DVD set. A second set, containing the complete third series was released on 9 October 2007

In October 2010 Network DVD announced the forthcoming release of Series 1 and 2 in a single Region B Blu-ray set, entitled Robin of Sherwood: Michael Praed (the 3-Disc Blu-ray and DVD bonus disc). This was released on 15 November 2010. In the US and Canada, the first and second series were released on 7 June 2011 by Acorn Media as Robin of Sherwood: Set 1.

Network DVD released Blu-ray set, entitled Robin of Sherwood: Jason Connery, on 31 October 2011.

Bonus features
On The Complete Collection DVD set, there are "seventeen hours of special features", including fourteen commentary tracks, a documentary on the folk group Clannad creating the score for the series, outtakes, bonus footage, a behind the scenes documentary, four documentaries that look back on the making of the show with former cast and crew, and other behind the scenes footage too.

Audio plays
In July 2015, Bafflegab Productions, the producers of the audio play/comic book series The Scarifyers, and co-producer Barnaby Eaton-Jones announced that they were adapting a feature-length script entitled Robin of Sherwood: The Knights Of The Apocalypse, written by Richard Carpenter before his death in 2012. Jason Connery, Judi Trott, Ray Winstone, Clive Mantle, Mark Ryan, Phil Rose, Philip Jackson, and Nickolas Grace (Robert of Huntingdon, Lady Marion, Will Scarlet, Little John, Nasir, Friar Tuck, Abbot Hugo, and the Sheriff of Nottingham, respectively) all agreed to reprise their roles for the project, with Daniel Abineri taking the role of Herne in place of his father, John Abineri, who died in 2000. In December 2015, Barnaby Eaton-Jones took over as sole producer of the audio play, with Spiteful Puppet (the award-winning audio company who produced 'Hood') as executive producers; as approved by ITV Studios and Richard 'Kip' Carpenter's estate. After beginning its crowdfunding campaign on Indiegogo in September 2015, the production set a goal of £10,000 within 30 days to cover production costs; due to enthusiastic fan support, however, the goal was reached in just under 24 hours. The audio play was released in 2016, with proceeds going to the Sherwood Forest Trust and the British Red Cross.

The success of the play led to Spiteful Puppet announcing a set of four further 'Robin of Sherwood' plays for 2017, two featuring Jason Connery and two featuring Michael Praed. This release was later pushed back to 2018 however a series of enhanced audiobooks was announced, with the first four being released in December 2017.

Books 
  Novelisation of the first series (Robin Hood and the Sorcerer, The Witch of Elsdon, Seven Poor Knights from Acre, Alan-A-Dale and The King's Fool) by series creator Richard Carpenter.
  Novelises the second series, but begins with The Swords of Wayland two-parter which actually came towards the end of the second series, not the beginning; it was intended to be shown first, but deferred to show its feature-length episode on the British Bank Holiday weekend. Also novelises Lord of the Trees, The Prophecy, The Children of Israel, The Enchantment, and The Greatest Enemy.
  Novelises Herne's Son Parts 1 and 2 and The Power of Albion from the beginning of Series Three, showing how Robert of Huntingdon became 'Robin.' All of these episodes were written by Richard Carpenter.
  Novelises the remaining episodes of Series Three that were written by Richard Carpenter (The Cross of St Ciricus, Rutterkin, and The Time of the Wolf Parts 1 & 2). (The episodes not novelised are The Inheritance, The Sheriff of Nottingham, Cromm Cruac, The Betrayal, Adam Bell, and The Pretender, i.e. the third-season episodes not written by Richard Carpenter.)
  The four Robin of Sherwood novelisations in one volume.
 
 
 
  Novelization of the audio drama, with a limited print run. Given as a bonus to supporters of the Indiegogo crowdfunding campaign for the audio drama.
  An episode guide to seasons 1-2 of the series, starring Michael Praed.
  An episode guide to season 3 of the series, starring Jason Connery.
  Novelization of the audiobook, with a limited print run. Note: "Jennifer Ash" is the pseudonym of writer Jenny Kane.
  Novelization of the audiobook, with a limited print run. 
  Novelization of the audiobook, with a limited print run.
 Original novel based on the TV series, with a limited print run.
  Novelization of the audiobook, with a limited print run.
  Original novel based on the TV series, with a limited print run.
  Anthology of novelizations of the audio material and original novels based on the TV series. Intended to represent the unmade fourth TV season. The contents are What Was Lost, by Elliot Thorpe and Iain Meadows; The Power of Three by Jennifer Ash; To Have and To Hold, Elliot Thorpe and Barnaby Eaton-Jones; Queen of the Black Sun by Kenton Hall and Iain Meadows; The Servant by Jennifer Ash; and a second novelisation of Richard Carpenter's Knights of the Apocalypse by Jennifer Ash. Published with a limited print run.
  Original novel based on the TV series, with a limited print run.
  Novelization of the audiobook, with a limited print run.
  Novelization of the audiobook, with a limited print run.
  Novelization of the audiobook, with a limited print run.

References

External links

 
 
 
 BBC.co.uk, BBC Wiltshire's Robin of Sherwood Retrospective and BBC.co.uk, audio interviews from 2004 with Nickolas Grace, Phil Rose and Richard Carpenter.

1984 British television series debuts
1986 British television series endings
1980s British drama television series
English-language television shows
British fantasy television series
ITV television dramas
Robin Hood television series
Television shows produced by Harlech Television (HTV)
Television series by ITV Studios
Television series set in the 12th century
Television series set in the 13th century
Cultural depictions of Richard I of England
Cultural depictions of John, King of England
Television about magic
Witchcraft in television